Ethan Charles A. Waller (born 13 August 1992) is an English rugby union prop who plays for Northampton Saints. He came through the Northampton Saints academy system and  made his debut in November 2012 against Harlequins and is the younger brother of Saints prop Alex. He has previously spent time at Coventry and Moseley on dual registration agreements.

The young prop's breakthrough season came in 2013/14 while fell Saints Alex Corbisiero was unavailable due to injury. Pushing his brother, Alex, for the number one shirt at the club in his later years at Saints, Ethan made 95 appearances in a Saints shirt and featured in some of the club's biggest games.

Making a large impact off the pitch with the fans, Waller hosted many charity events while as Saints, including writing a Christmas Pantomime two years running, in which the whole squad performed.

The young prop also helped Saints' second side the Northampton Wanderers lift the Aviva 'A' League trophy in 2016/17, beating Gloucester United in the final at Franklin's Gardens.

It was announced on 19 January 2017 that Waller would leave his first club Saints and join fellow  Aviva Premiership side Worcester Warriors for the 2017/18 campaign.

References

External links 
Ethan Waller profile at Northampton Saints
Ethan Waller career statistics at Statbunker

1992 births
Living people
Coventry R.F.C. players
English rugby union players
Moseley Rugby Football Club players
Northampton Saints players
Rugby union players from Kettering
Rugby union props